Colorado do Oeste is a municipality located in the Brazilian state of Rondônia. Its population was 15,544 (2020) and its area is 1,451 km².

References

Municipalities in Rondônia